Alexis King de Azevedo (born January 14, 1943) is an American composer, song writer, pianist, actor and singer known primarily for his film scores and his work on The Swan Princess of which one of his songs was nominated for a Golden Globe Award. De Azevedo, a member of the Church of Jesus Christ of Latter-day Saints, also produced the music for the LDS musical Saturday's Warrior.

Biography
Lex de Azevedo was born in Los Angeles, the son of Alyce King of the King Sisters by her first marriage.
He served as a musical director for The Sonny & Cher Show, Michael Jackson and the Jackson Five and the Osmonds. He composed the scores for the films Where the Red Fern Grows (1974), Against a Crooked Sky (1975), Baker's Hawk (1976), Brigham (1977) and The Swan Princess (1994), for the latter he was nominated for a Golden Globe in 1995 for the song "Far Longer than Forever".

During the 1960s, De Azevedo produced several albums for Capitol Records, including Laurindo Almeida's Plays for a Man and a Woman and the Four King Cousins' Introducing the Four King Cousins.

He produced the hit version, by the Youngstown, Ohio-based quartet the Human Beinz, of the Isley Brothers' "Nobody but Me", which rose to #8 in 1968. He composed for pop singers (including many members of his own family) and the stage.

He is also credited as the co-writer of the Latter-day Saint production, Saturday's Warrior.

De Azevedo has ten children. His daughters Rachel and Emilie are the creators and producers of the Signing Time! videos, designed to teach children American Sign Language, and he appears in them during the grandparents sequence of Vol. 2. De Azevedo's daughter Julie de Azevedo Hanks is a Latter-day Saint inspirational pop singer. She is also a psychologist who owns and runs Wasatch Family Therapy.

Discography

Mountains (Aubergine, 1991)
Moab (Aubergine, 1993)
Variations On A Sacred Theme (Shadow Mountain, 1998)
Variations On A Sacred Theme, Vol. 2 (Shadow Mountain, 1999)
A Time To Love (Embryo, 2006)

Lex de Azevedo has also recorded hundreds of instrumental versions of popular songs. These were intended for airplay on beautiful music radio stations and were not released commercially.  These tracks are a mainstay on the Sirius XM channel Escape, which usually plays at least one of de Azevedo's recordings each hour. They have been made available for download at Surrey House Music's website and also on YouTube.

See also
LDS fiction
My Turn on Earth

References

External links
  – official website and bio
  Biography by Dacia A. Blodgett-Williams at Almusic.com
 
 
 Radio interview (Program originally aired on KSL Radio on November 28, 1999.)
 
 Lex De Azevedo music scores and sketches, MSS 2150, L. Tom Perry Special Collections, Harold B. Lee Library, Brigham Young University

1943 births
Living people
American film score composers
American television composers
Songwriters from California
Record producers from California
Animation composers
Latter Day Saints from California
American people of Brazilian descent
American people of Portuguese descent
Classical musicians from California
King family (show business)
Easy listening musicians
American male film score composers
Musicians from Los Angeles
American male songwriters